Thomas Grey, 2nd Earl of Stamford, PC (c. 165431 January 1720) was a British peer and politician.

Grey was the only son of Thomas, Lord Grey of Groby, and inherited his title from his grandfather. His mother was Lady Dorothy Bourchier, daughter of Edward Bourchier, 4th Earl of Bath.

Grey took some part in resisting the arbitrary actions of James II, and was arrested in July 1685. After his release he took up arms on behalf of William of Orange in the Glorious Revolution, after whose accession to the throne he was made a Privy Counsellor (1694) and Lord Lieutenant of Devon (1696). Politically he was described as an "unrepentant Whig", who reaffirmed his belief in the Popish Plot by voting against the motion to reverse the attainder on William Howard, 1st Viscount Stafford.

In 1697 he became Chancellor of the Duchy of Lancaster, and in 1699 President of the Board of Trade, being dismissed from his office upon the accession of Anne in 1702. From 1707 to 1711, however, he was again President of the Board of Trade.

He married twice: firstly in 1651, Elizabeth, daughter of Sir Daniel Harvey (diplomat), ambassador to the Ottoman Empire (divorced), and secondly in 1691, Mary, daughter of Joseph Maynard, MP in the Cavalier Parliament. On his death without surviving children, his titles and Leicestershire estate at Bradgate Park passed to his first cousin Henry Grey, 3rd Earl of Stamford (1685–1739), a grandson of the first earl, from whom the later earls were descended.

Arms

The arms of the head of the Grey family are blazoned Barry of six argent and azure in chief three torteaux gules.

See also
 List of deserters from James II to William of Orange

Notes

References

Kenyon, J. P. The Popish Plot 2nd Edition Phoenix Press 2000

1650s births
1720 deaths
Year of birth uncertain
17th-century English nobility
18th-century English nobility
Chancellors of the Duchy of Lancaster
Lord-Lieutenants of Devon
Members of the Privy Council of England
Fellows of the Royal Society
People of the Rye House Plot
Thomas
Earls of Stamford
Presidents of the Board of Trade
Whig (British political party) politicians
People of the Glorious Revolution
Barons Grey of Groby